"Something More Beautiful" is the first single from Australian singer Nikki Webster's second studio album, Bliss (2002), released on 29 July 2002. It peaked at No. 13 on the Australian ARIA Singles Chart in August 2002. The song was originally recorded by American girl group P.Y.T. in 1999.

Music video
The music video for "Something More Beautiful" is set in a 3D underwater world. It was directed by Mark Hartley, with dancing choreographed by William Forsythe. A behind the scenes look at the making of the video is included on The Best of Nikki Webster DVD.

Track listing

Charts

Weekly charts

Year-end charts

Certifications

References

1999 debut singles
Nikki Webster songs
2002 singles
Songs written by Johan Åberg
Songs written by Paul Rein